Hydroxyl-terminated polybutadiene (HTPB) is an oligomer of butadiene terminated at each end with a hydroxyl functional group. It reacts with isocyanates to form polyurethane polymers.

HTPB is a translucent liquid with a color similar to wax paper and a viscosity similar to corn syrup. The properties vary because HTPB is a mixture rather than a pure compound, and it is manufactured to meet customers' specific requirements. A typical HTPB is R-45HTLO.  This product consists of oligomeric units typically containing 40–50 butadiene molecules bonded together, with each end of the chain terminated with a hydroxyl [OH] group: 

R-45HTLO has a functionality of 2.4-2.6, which means that there is (approximately) one additional hydroxyl group located along the chain for every two oligomeric units.  This provides side-to-side linkage for a stronger cured product.  HTPB is usually cured by an addition reaction with di- or poly-isocyanate compounds.

Uses

Materials Production
Polyurethanes prepared from HTPB can be engineered for specific physical properties; polyurethanes may be highly elastic or tough and rigid. Some products include: rigid foam insulation panels; durable elastomeric wheels and tires (used for roller coasters, escalators, skateboards, etc.); automotive suspension bushings; electrical potting compounds; high-performance adhesives; surface coatings and surface sealants; synthetic fibers (e.g., Spandex); carpet underlay; hard-plastic parts (e.g., for electronic instruments).

Rocket Propellant

An important application of HTPB is in solid rocket propellant. It binds the oxidizing agent, fuel and other ingredients into a solid but elastic mass in most composite propellant systems. The cured polyurethane acts as a fuel in such mixtures.  For example, HTPB is used in all 3/4 stages of the Japanese M-5 rocket satellite launchers and PSLV rocket developed by ISRO for satellite launches.  JAXA describes the propellant as "HTPB/AP/Al=12/68/20", which means, proportioned by mass, HTPB plus curative 12% (binder and fuel), ammonium perchlorate 68% (oxidizer), and aluminum powder 20% (fuel).

Similar propellants, often referred to as APCP (ammonium perchlorate composite propellant) are used in larger model rockets.  A typical APCP produces 2–3 times the specific impulse of the black powder propellant used in most smaller rocket motors.

Rocketry is an important factor for the sale of HTPB. While used in Solid-propellant rocket's the Rocket Propellant is also moderately used as a hybrid rocket fuel. When combined with Nitrous Oxide, as the Oxidizer it can be used for both land vehicles and rockets.

HTPB is also used as a hybrid rocket fuel. With N2O (nitrous oxide, or "laughing gas") as the oxidizer, it is used to power the SpaceShipTwo hybrid rocket motor developed by SpaceDev. The land speed record attempt Bloodhound SSC  was to have used HTPB with a high-test peroxide oxidizer, but that plan was altered in 2017.

References

External links

US Patent 5159123 description of synthesis and other details.

Polyols
Organic polymers
Rocket fuels